Cheshmeh Now (also known as Maḩalleh-ye Cheshmeh Now and Tānk-e Cheshmeh Now) is a village in Sakhvid Rural District, Nir District, Taft County, Yazd Province, Iran. At the 2006 census, its population was 17, in 7 families.

References 

Populated places in Taft County